The Bukovina blind mole-rat or (erroneously) the Balkan blind mole-rat (Spalax graecus) is a species of rodent in the family Spalacidae found in Romania, Moldova, and Ukraine.

Taxonomy 
The specific epithet graecus, as well as the reference to the Balkans in its former scientific name, both derive from the type specimen, which was initially thought to have been collected in the vicinity of Athens, Greece. However, in 1969 this was found to be erroneous, and the type locality was corrected to the vicinity of Chernovtsy, Ukraine.

Formerly, this species was thought to comprise three disjunct subspecies: the type subspecies graecus, inhabiting northern Romania, Moldova, and southwestern Ukraine, Mehely's blind mole-rat (subspecies antiquus), thought to be endemic to central Romania, and the possibly extinct Oltenia blind mole-rat (subspecies istricus), thought to be endemic to southern Romania. However, a 2013 morphological and phylogenetic analysis found antiquus and istricus to represent distinct species from graecus. The American Society of Mammalogists and IUCN Red List followed the results of this study. This leaves S. graecus with a much smaller distribution than it was previously thought to have.

Description 
The organism can be described as having a long, cylindrical body with no neck and relatively weak limbs. The Bukovina mole rats are blind and do not possess any external ears.

Distribution and habitat 
This species is found in a small area of northeastern Romania, southwestern Ukraine, and northwestern Moldova. Part of its range roughly coincides with the historical region of Bukovina. It inhabits steppe, pastures, cultivated fields, and orchards.

Threats 
This species is thought to be threatened by intensive agriculture, which has been implicated in the decline of the sympatric lesser blind mole-rat (Nannospalax leucodon) in the same region. In Transylvania, subsistence agriculture is still practiced, and thus the population appears stable there, but the addition of Romania to the European Union in the 2007 enlargement of the European Union may spur further intensive agriculture within its habitat.

References

Spalax
Rodents of Europe
Mammals described in 1898
Taxonomy articles created by Polbot